Linnévatnet is a lake in Nordenskiöld Land at Spitsbergen, Svalbard. It is located in the lower part of the valley Linnédalen, and has a length of about 4.5 kilometers. The lake is among the largest lakes of Spitsbergen. It is named after Swedish botanist Carl Linnaeus.

References

Lakes of Spitsbergen